Gary Mitchell Lavergne (born October 28, 1955) is an American non-fiction author. Among his subjects are killers Charles J. Whitman, and Kenneth Allen McDuff.

Career 
Lavergne was born in Church Point, Louisiana. He earned a bachelor of arts degree in social studies education and a master's in education at the University of Louisiana at Lafayette. In 1988, he earned an education specialist degree in educational administration and supervision from McNeese State University. He was a social studies teacher, held administrative positions for both the SAT and the ACT college entrance exam companies, and in between jobs performed stand-up comedy. He worked for the College Board traveling to universities helping administrators understand the SAT. Lavergne retired as director of admissions research for the University of Texas in 2019. Among Lavergne's books is 1997's A Sniper in the Tower about the 1966 shooting rampage of Charles Whitman, which according to a 2007 Associated Press article is "considered the definitive account of the massacre" and to Frank Rich in a 1997 The New York Times piece is "the authoritative account of the Whitman case".

Published works
Before Brown (2010), about the struggle for civil rights in higher education, centered on the Sweatt v. Painter case at the University of Texas at Austin.
Worse than Death (2003), about Moroccan national Abdelkrim Belachheb, who walked into a Dallas nightclub and gunned down seven people. Published by UNT Press.
Bad Boy from Rosebud (1999), about serial killer Kenneth McDuff. Published by UNT Press.
A Sniper in the Tower (1997), about Charles Whitman, who shot people from the University of Texas at Austin's tower in 1966. Published by UNT Press.

References

External links
Chronicle of Higher Education Commentary on Virginia Tech Tragedy.

Living people
1955 births
20th-century American novelists
21st-century American novelists
American male novelists
American non-fiction crime writers
University of Louisiana at Lafayette alumni
Cajun writers
Novelists from Louisiana
People from Church Point, Louisiana
20th-century American male writers
21st-century American male writers
20th-century American non-fiction writers
21st-century American non-fiction writers
American male non-fiction writers